FKG may refer to:
 Falkirk Grahamston railway station, in Scotland
 FKG inequality
 Furkating Junction railway station, in Assam, India
 Genk railway station, in Belgium